General elections were held in Liberia in 1931. In the presidential election, the result was a victory for incumbent Edwin Barclay of the True Whig Party, who defeated Thomas J. Faulkner of the People's Party to win a first full term (Barclay had originally taken office following the resignation of Charles D. B. King in December 1930).

References

Liberia
1931 in Liberia
Elections in Liberia
Election and referendum articles with incomplete results